Cyrtophyllicus is a genus of shield-backed katydids in the family Tettigoniidae. There is one described species in Cyrtophyllicus, C. chlorum.

References

Further reading

 

Tettigoniinae
Articles created by Qbugbot
Monotypic Orthoptera genera